Dalibor Slezák (born 28 January 1970) is a former Czech football player.

Slezák played for various Czech football clubs but is best known as a player of Bohemians Prague, where he is perceived by fans as a legendary player. He ended his rich football career at the age of 40 after the last match of the 2009-2010 season.

References

External links
 Profile at iDNES.cz
 Profile at Bohemians 1905 website
 Bohemians 1905: Dalibor Slezák: Splnil jsem si sen

Czech footballers
FC Baník Ostrava players
FC Slovan Liberec players
FC Hradec Králové players
SK Sigma Olomouc players
FK Mladá Boleslav players
FK Jablonec players
1. FC Slovácko players
1970 births
Living people
Expatriate footballers in China
Association football forwards
SK Sparta Krč players
People from Kroměříž
Bohemians 1905 players
Sportspeople from the Zlín Region